Charles Lawrence Reynolds (May 1, 1865 – July 3, 1944) was a catcher in Major League Baseball. He played in one game for the Kansas City Cowboys and 12 games for the Brooklyn Bridegrooms during the 1889 baseball season.

References

External links

1865 births
1944 deaths
19th-century baseball players
Major League Baseball catchers
Baseball players from Indiana
Kansas City Cowboys players
Brooklyn Bridegrooms players
People from Wayne County, Indiana
Leavenworth Soldiers players
Hastings Hustlers players
Kansas City Blues (baseball) players
Denver Grizzlies (baseball) players
Denver Mountaineers players
Sacramento Senators players